The 1959 VMI Keydets football team  was an American football team that represented the Virginia Military Institute (VMI) as a member of the Southern Conference (SoCon) during the 1959 NCAA University Division football season. Led by seventh-year head coach John McKenna, the Keydets compiled an overall record of 8–1–1 with a mark of 5–0–1 in conference play, winning the SoCon title.

Schedule

References

VMI
VMI Keydets football seasons
Southern Conference football champion seasons
VMI Keydets football